Mohana Punnagai is a 1981 Indian Tamil-language film written and directed by Sridhar. The film stars Sivaji Ganesan, Geetha, Jayabharathi, Padmapriya, Anuradha and Anandhi. It was released on 14 January 1981. The film was an average grosser in Tamil Nadu, but performed better in Sri Lanka.

Plot 
The film tells the story of the Raju who is a rich man who has everything except for him being unlucky when it comes to matters of love. There are four women who comes into his life only for him to lose them. He meets and falls in love with Geetha while on excursion of a business trip to Sri Lanka. He poses as a photographer for magazine, wins her love and gets things to a point of marriage. Unfortunately for him, his cross-cousin, who he is very close to, would have married but for falling in love with Geetha and who has been in love with him from his childhood, Bhama, in her possessiveness, kills Geetha on the wedding altar and killing herself too.

He is heartbroken and taken to drink. His secretary, Radha, slowly but steadily brings him out of his depression and makes him look at the bright side of life again. Just when he starts to think that she is in love with him, she introduces her boyfriend and seeks his blessings, as a well-wisher, for their marriage. He does it and moves on vowing never to look at women again.

Sarasu, a teen girl and granddaughter of his servant, having watch him go to failure from failure develops an infatuation on him. To add to this, he helps her education, guides her and at one point, upon the death of her grandfather, even goes to becoming her guardian. She intends to marry him and give him the happiness that has eluded him always. Noticing the jarring age difference now that she is twenty and he is fifty, he forcefully arranges for her marriage taking the place of her father only for her to commit suicide soon after the marriage, leaving him all alone.

Cast 
Sivaji Ganesan ... Rajasekar / Raju / Raghavan
Geetha as Gowri
Jayabharathi as Radha
Padmapriya as Bhama
Anuradha as Sarasu
Anandhi as Mary
Major Sundarrajan as Moorthy
Nagesh as Narasimmachari
S. A. Kannan as Sarasu's father
Gemini Maali as Gowri's father
Chinni Prakash as Sarasu's husband

Soundtrack 
Music was by M. S. Viswanathan and lyrics were by Vaali.

References

External links 
 

1980s Tamil-language films
1981 films
Films directed by C. V. Sridhar
Films scored by M. S. Viswanathan
Films with screenplays by C. V. Sridhar